Cerina Vincent (born February 7, 1979) is an American actress. She had her breakthrough role starring as Maya in the television series Power Rangers Lost Galaxy, followed by a part in the comedy film Not Another Teen Movie, before going on to star in the horror film Cabin Fever, which established her as a "scream queen" and led to further roles in horror movies. More recently, she appeared as Suzy Diaz in the Disney Channel series Stuck in the Middle. She has also written three books with Jodi Lipper, wrote a regular column for The Huffington Post, and co-hosts the podcast Raising Amazing with Dr. Joel Gator.

Early life
Vincent was born on February 7, 1979, in Las Vegas, Nevada, to parents of Italian descent. Vincent loved to perform from an early age, encouraged by her mother, who was a dance instructor. She performed in a Christmas production at Diskin Elementary School, learning the lines for all the characters. She also appeared in productions at the Rainbow Company Youth Theater, which was sponsored by the Cultural Affairs division of Las Vegas. In 1996, at the age of sixteen, Vincent won the Miss Nevada Teen USA title and competed at Miss Teen USA. Though she made it to the top 15, she failed to place at the pageant (televised live), which was held in Las Cruces, New Mexico.

Vincent graduated from Durango High School in 1997, and moved to Los Angeles, where she attended Marymount College on a scholarship. Between classes, she went on auditions and eventually landed several commercials and a role on USA High for the USA Network.

Career

1990s
In 1999, Vincent made her film debut in the direct-to-video thriller Fear Runs Silent, starring Billy Dee Williams. Her first significant role as an actress, however, was as the Yellow Galaxy Ranger, Maya, in the television series Power Rangers Lost Galaxy, the seventh season of the program's franchise that aired from February 6, 1999 to December 18, 1999. Vincent later recalled, "It was a great way to learn a lot and get a taste for this business on a small show like that, but for kids. It was cool to be a role model for kids."

Following the success of Power Rangers Lost Galaxy, Vincent appeared on MTV's Undressed, Son of the Beach, Malcolm in the Middle, Felicity and Ally McBeal. She also returned as Maya in the two-part Power Rangers Lightspeed Rescue episode, “Trakeena’s Revenge”, which saw the two teams of Rangers team up.

2000s 
In 2001, Vincent landed her first role in a major motion picture, spoof film Not Another Teen Movie, playing foreign exchange student Areola. The part notably required her to be nude whenever she appeared throughout the movie: as a satirical take on the gratuitous nudity that was prevalent in teen films of the time, and specifically as a parody of Shannon Elizabeth's character Nadia in American Pie, the character never wears clothes, even in public. Vincent is naked in all of her scenes, with her body serving as a sight gag of sorts: subtitles for her ever-changing accent are spaced to avoid obscuring her breasts, as she interacts with fully clothed characters, none of whom seem to notice her out-of-place nudity. 

Vincent described taking the part as a "huge decision" for her, having never previously done any nude scenes. She initially turned down the role several times, ultimately deciding to do it because she thought it was funny; however, she still had reservations about performing in the nude for the first time and so extensively. In a 2011 interview, Vincent explained: 
Vincent appeared in the 2020 documentary Skin: A History of Nudity in the Movies in a segment discussing the role.

In 2003, Vincent starred in the R-rated horror film Cabin Fever, which featured some of her most memorable film moments, including her "leg-shaving" scene and the "plane-crash" seduction and sex scene. The film included topless scenes and two sex scenes with two different characters. Fearing that she would be typecast into nude roles, Vincent was cautious about over-exposing herself in the film, which became a point of contention between her and director Eli Roth.

Starting in 2004, Vincent appeared in a series of theatrical and television films, including Murder-Set-Pieces (2004) as the L.A. Girl, Intermedio (2005) as Gen, and Conversations with Other Women (2005) as Sarah the Dancer. In 2005, she appeared in her first starring role in the film It Waits (2005) as forest ranger Danielle "Danny" St. Claire. Vincent made several television appearances beginning in 2005, with appearances on CSI: Crime Scene Investigation, Palmetto Pointe and Sex, Love & Secrets. Since then, she has also worked on the series Bones, Two and a Half Men, Gary Unmarried, Zombie Family, Mike & Molly, and The Walking Dead. In 2006, she appeared in The Surfer King as Tiffany, Seven Mummies as Lacy, and the Sci-Fi Channel original movie Sasquatch Mountain as Erin Price, alongside Lance Henriksen. In 2007, she appeared in the television films Manchild and Wifey, as well as Return to House on Haunted Hill as Michelle, and Everybody Wants to Be Italian as Marisa Costa. In 2008, she appeared in Toxic as Malvi, the independent film, Just Add Water as The Mrs., and in Fashion Victim.

2010s
Vincent returned to films in 2012, appearing in Complacent as Myah Sanderson and Chasing Happiness as Andrea, and playing the title role in MoniKa, for which she was also the executive producer. In 2013, Vincent appeared in the Hallmark Channel original movie The Thanksgiving House in the role of Ashleigh, and produced and starred in the acclaimed horror short Skypemare, which also starred Annika Marks and featured Ryan Dillon and Adam J. Yeend; the film screened at Telluride Horror Show and ScreamFest 2013 in Los Angeles. In 2017, Vincent had a small role in the indie movie Broken Memories.

From 2016 to 2018, Vincent played Suzy Diaz, mother to seven children, on the Disney Channel series Stuck in the Middle. The series ran for three seasons.

Vincent's most recent performances include the lead role of Jen in the 2018 feature film thriller The Work Wife, a 2019 guest starring appearance on NCIS: Los Angeles, and a part in the 2020 Lifetime TV movie My Daughter's Psycho Friend.

Personal life
In November 2018, Vincent announced her pregnancy with her first child, a boy with her long-time partner Mike Estes. Her son was born in February 2019.

Filmography

Film

Television

Books
Vincent and her co-writer Jodi Lipper wrote a regular column for HuffPost from 2007 to 2016. The pair have also authored three books:

References

External links
 
 

1979 births
20th-century American actresses
21st-century American actresses
20th-century Miss Teen USA delegates
1996 beauty pageant contestants
Actresses from Las Vegas
American film actresses
American people of Italian descent
American podcasters
American television actresses
American women columnists
American women podcasters
HuffPost writers and columnists
Living people